The 2021–22 Los Angeles Clippers season was the 52nd season of the franchise in the National Basketball Association (NBA), their 44th season in Southern California and their 38th season in Los Angeles. The Clippers qualified for the play-in, but failed to reach the playoffs for the first time since 2018 after being defeated by both the Minnesota Timberwolves and the New Orleans Pelicans in the Play-In Tournament, who coincidentally made their first playoff appearances since 2018. It is also the first time in Kawhi Leonard's career that his team missed the playoffs, however, he did not feature at all for the Clippers during the season due to injury.

Draft

Roster

Roster notes
Point guard Jason Preston missed the entire season due to a right foot injury.
Small forward Kawhi Leonard missed the entire season due to a knee injury.
Point guard Eric Bledsoe made his second tour of duty with team having played for them from 2010-13.  He played in 54 games before getting traded away in February.

Standings

Division

Conference

Game log

Preseason

|-style="background:#cfc;"
| 1
| October 4
| Denver
| 
| Terance Mann (14)
| Harry Giles III (12)
| Terance Mann (5)
| Staples Center7,825
| 1–0
|-style="background:#fcc;"
| 2
| October 6
| Sacramento
| 
| Brandon Boston Jr. (20)
| Brandon Boston Jr. (7)
| Eric Bledsoe (4)
| Staples Center8,122
| 1–1
|-style="background:#fcc;"
| 3
| October 8
| @ Dallas
| 
| Luke Kennard (19)
| Giles III, Hartenstein (8)
| George, Hartenstein (5)
| American Airlines Center17,853
| 1–2
|-style="background:#fcc;"
| 4
| October 11
| Minnesota
| 
| Luke Kennard (18)
| Ivica Zubac (9)
| Eric Bledsoe (5)
| Toyota Arena4,850
| 1–3

Regular season

|-style="background:#fcc;"
| 1
| October 21
| @ Golden State
| 
| Paul George (29)
| Paul George (11)
| George, Jackson (6)
| Chase Center18,064
| 0–1
|-style="background:#fcc;"
| 2
| October 23
| Memphis
| 
| Paul George (41)
| Paul George (10)
| Eric Bledsoe (7)
| Staples Center16,748
| 0–2
|-style="background:#cfc;"
| 3
| October 25
| Portland
| 
| Luke Kennard (23)
| Ivica Zubac (8)
| Eric Bledsoe (7)
| Staples Center15,672
| 1–2
|-style="background:#fcc;"
| 4
| October 27
| Cleveland
| 
| Batum, Jackson (16)
| Paul George (10)
| Bledsoe, Jackson, Kennard, Mann (3)
| Staples Center13,276
| 1–3
|-style="background:#fcc;"
| 5
| October 29
| @ Portland
| 
| Paul George (42)
| Nicolas Batum (9)
| Jackson, Mann (4)
| Moda Center16,510
| 1–4

|-style="background:#cfc;"
| 6
| November 1
| Oklahoma City
| 
| Paul George (32)
| Isaiah Hartenstein (12)
| Paul George (7)
| Staples Center13,722
| 2–4
|-style="background:#cfc;"
| 7
| November 3
| @ Minnesota
| 
| Paul George (32)
| George, Zubac (6)
| George, Jackson (8)
| Target Center15,386
| 3–4
|-style="background:#cfc;"
| 8
| November 5
| @ Minnesota
| 
| Paul George (21)
| Ivica Zubac (14)
| Paul George (6)
| Target Center17,136
| 4–4
|-style="background:#cfc;"
| 9
| November 7
| Charlotte
| 
| Paul George (20)
| Ivica Zubac (11)
| Paul George (8)
| Staples Center15,781
| 5–4
|-style="background:#cfc;"
| 10
| November 9
| Portland
| 
| Paul George (24)
| Paul George (9)
| Paul George (7)
| Staples Center14,131
| 6–4
|-style="background:#cfc;"
| 11
| November 11
| Miami
| 
| Paul George (27)
| Ivica Zubac (11)
| Paul George (5)
| Staples Center16,150
| 7–4
|-style="background:#cfc;"
| 12
| November 13
| Minnesota
|  
| Paul George (23)
| Hartenstein, Zubac (12)
| Eric Bledsoe (9)
| Staples Center15,285
| 8–4
|-style="background:#fcc;"
| 13
| November 14
| Chicago
| 
| Paul George (27)
| Paul George (11)
| Paul George (4)
| Staples Center17,899
| 8–5
|-style="background:#cfc;"
| 14
| November 16
| San Antonio
| 
| Paul George (34)
| Paul George (13)
| George, Jackson (4)
| Staples Center13,298
| 9–5
|-style="background:#fcc;"
| 15
| November 18
| @ Memphis
| 
| Paul George (23)
| Ivica Zubac (7)
| Paul George (6)
| FedExForum13,419
| 9–6
|-style="background:#fcc;"
| 16
| November 19
| @ New Orleans
| 
| Paul George (19)
| Ivica Zubac (11)
| Paul George (6)
| Smoothie King Center15,274
| 9–7
|-style="background:#cfc;"
| 17
| November 21
| Dallas
| 
| Paul George (29)
| Ivica Zubac (10)
| Paul George (6)
| Staples Center17,149
| 10–7
|-style="background:#fcc;"
| 18
| November 23
| Dallas
| 
| Reggie Jackson (31)
| Paul George (6)
| Reggie Jackson (10) 
| Staples Center17,067
| 10–8
|-style="background:#cfc;"
| 19
| November 26
| Detroit
| 
| Reggie Jackson (21)
| Ivica Zubac (13)
| George, Jackson, Kennard (4)
| Staples Center18,139
| 11–8
|-style="background:#fcc;"
| 20
| November 28
| Golden State
| 
| Paul George (30)
| Eric Bledsoe (10)
| George, Morris (5)
| Staples Center19,068
| 11–9
|-style="background:#fcc;"
| 21
| November 29
| New Orleans
| 
| Paul George (27)
| Terance Mann (7)
| Terance Mann (5)
| Staples Center15,691
| 11–10

|-style="background:#fcc;"
| 22
| December 1
| Sacramento
| 
| Kennard, Mann (19)
| Isaiah Hartenstein (8)
| Reggie Jackson (6)
| Staples Center17,217
| 11–11
|-style="background:#cfc;"
| 23
| December 3
| @ L. A. Lakers
| 
| Marcus Morris (21)
| Paul George (8)
| Paul George (9)
| Staples Center18,997
| 12–11
|-style="background:#fcc;"
| 24
| December 4
| @ Sacramento
| 
| Marcus Morris (21)
| Ivica Zubac (11)
| Paul George (10)
| Golden 1 Center15,004
| 12–12
|-style="background:#cfc;"
| 25
| December 6
| @ Portland
| 
| Paul George (21)
| Paul George (8)
| Reggie Jackson (6)
| Moda Center15,865
| 13–12
|-style="background:#cfc;"
| 26
| December 8
| Boston
| 
| Brandon Boston Jr. (27)
| Mann, Zubac (10)
| Reggie Jackson (7)
| Staples Center17,064
| 14–12
|-style="background:#cfc;"
| 27
| December 11
| Orlando
| 
| Reggie Jackson (25)
| Terance Mann (9)
| Bledsoe, Hartenstein, Kennard (5)
| Staples Center17,156
| 15–12
|-style="background:#cfc;"
| 28
| December 13
| Phoenix
| 
| Marcus Morris (24)
| Marcus Morris (11)
| Isaiah Hartenstein (7)
| Staples Center17,909
| 16–12
|-style="background:#fcc;"
| 29
| December 15
| @ Utah
| 
| Marcus Morris (24)
| Marcus Morris (8)
| Reggie Jackson (9)
| Vivint Arena18,306
| 16–13
|-style="background:#fcc;"
| 30
| December 18
| @ Oklahoma
| 
| Luke Kennard (27)
| Justise Winslow (9)
| Reggie Jackson (10)
| Paycom Center15,123
| 16–14
|-style="background:#fcc;"
| 31
| December 20
| San Antonio
| 
| Paul George (25)
| Ivica Zubac (12)
| Paul George (6)
| Staples Center18,096
| 16–15
|-style="background:#cfc;"
| 32
| December 22
| @ Sacramento
|  
| Eric Bledsoe (19)
| Eric Bledsoe (8)
| Eric Bledsoe (7)
| Golden 1 Center15,386
| 17–15
|-style="background:#fcc;"
| 33
| December 26
| Denver
| 
| Bledsoe, Boston Jr. (18) 
| Ivica Zubac (11)
| Eric Bledsoe (10) 
| Crypto.com Arena17,759
| 17–16
|-style="background:#fcc;"
| 34
| December 27
| Brooklyn
| 
| Marcus Morris (25)
| Winslow, Zubac (9)
| Bledsoe, Morris (6)
| Crypto.com Arena17,128
| 17–17 
|-style="background:#cfc;"
| 35
| December 29
| Boston
| 
| Marcus Morris (23)
| Ivica Zubac (14)
| Bledsoe, Kennard (4)
| TD Garden19,156
| 18-17
|-style="background:#fcc;"
| 36
| December 31
| @ Toronto
| 
| Marcus Morris (20)
| Terance Mann (11)
| Bledsoe, Kennard (6)
| Scotiabank Arena0
| 18–18

|-style="background:#cfc;"
| 37
| January 1
| @ Brooklyn
| 
| Eric Bledsoe (27)
| Amir Coffey (8)
| Amir Coffey (5)
| Barclays Center17,732
| 19–18
|-style="background:#fcc;"
| 38
| January 3
| Minnesota
| 
| Serge Ibaka (17)
| Amir Coffey (5)
| Eric Bledsoe (5)
| Crypto.com Arena15,959
| 19–19
|-style="background:#fcc;"
| 39
| January 6
| @ Phoenix
| 
| Marcus Morris (26)
| Jackson, Morris (8)
| Terance Mann (4)
| Footprint Center17,071
| 19–20
|-style="background:#fcc;"
| 40
| January 8
| Memphis
| 
| Marcus Morris (29)
| Mann, Morris (8)
| Amir Coffey (3)
| Crypto.com Arena17,936
| 19–21
|-style="background:#cfc;"
| 41
| January 9
| Atlanta
| 
| Amir Coffey (21)
| Ivica Zubac (13)
| Eric Bledsoe (7)
| Crypto.com Arena14,836
| 20–21
|-style="background:#cfc;"
| 42
| January 11
| Denver
| 
| Amir Coffey (18)
| Serge Ibaka (9)
| Eric Bledsoe (9)
| Crypto.com Arena15,077
| 21–21
|-style="background:#fcc;"
| 43
| January 13
| @ New Orleans
| 
| Terance Mann (15)
| Coffey, Ibaka, Jackson (6)
| Amir Coffey (5)
| Smoothie King Center15,406
| 21–22
|-style="background:#fcc;"
| 44
| January 15
| @ San Antonio
| 
| Amir Coffey (20)
| Serge Ibaka (10)
| Bledsoe, Morris (5)
| AT&T Center13,223
| 21–23
|-style="background:#cfc;"
| 45
| January 17
| Indiana
| 
| Nicolas Batum (32)
| Marcus Morris (8)
| Amir Coffey (7)
| Crypto.com Arena15,080
| 22–23
|-style="background:#fcc;"
| 46
| January 19
| @ Denver
| 
| Ivica Zubac (32)
| Ivica Zubac (10)
| Reggie Jackson (12)
| Ball Arena14,547
| 22–24
|-style="background:#cfc;"
| 47
| January 21
| @ Philadelphia
| 
| Reggie Jackson (19)
| Ivica Zubac (10)
| Reggie Jackson (9)
| Wells Fargo Center20,182
| 23–24
|-style="background:#fcc;"
| 48
| January 23
| @ New York
| 
| Reggie Jackson (26)
| Ivica Zubac (14)
| Eric Bledsoe (6)
| Madison Square Garden19,812
| 23–25
|-style="background:#cfc;"
| 49
| January 25
| @ Washington
| 
| Amir Coffey (29)
| Luke Kennard (8)
| Kennard, Hartenstein (6)
| Capital One Arena13,544
| 24–25
|-style="background:#cfc;"
| 50
| January 26
| @ Orlando
| 
| Amir Coffey (19)
| Nicolas Batum (8)
| Amir Coffey (5)
| Amway Center12,448
| 25–25
|-style="background:#fcc;"
| 51
| January 28
| @ Miami
| 
| Luke Kennard (23)
| Justise Winslow (10)
| Eric Bledsoe (6)
| FTX Arena19,600
| 25–26
|-style="background:#cfc;"
| 52
| January 30
| @ Charlotte
| 
|  Jackson, Boston Jr (19)
| Zubac, Kennard (10)
| Reggie Jackson (5)
| Spectrum Center18,674
| 26–26
|-style="background:#fcc"
| 53
| January 31
| @ Indiana
| 
| Amir Coffey (27)
| Serge Ibaka (11)
| Reggie Jackson (5)
| Gainbridge Fieldhouse14,629
| 26–27

|-style="background:#cfc;"
| 54
| February 3
| L.A. Lakers
| 
| Marcus Morris (29)
| Serge Ibaka (9)
| Eric Bledsoe (7)
| Crypto.com Arena19,068
| 27–27
|-style="background:#fcc;"
| 55
| February 6
| Milwaukee
| 
| Norman Powell (28)
| Marcus Morris (8)
| Jackson, Mann (5)
| Crypto.com Arena17,395
| 27–28
|-style="background:#fcc;"
| 56
| February 8
| @ Memphis
| 
| Isaiah Hartenstein (19)
| Hartenstein, Zubac (7)
| Terance Mann (7)
| FedEx Forum16,101
| 27–29
|-style="background:#fcc;"
| 57
| February 10
| @ Dallas
| 
| Marcus Morris (21)
| Norman Powell (6)
| Reggie Jackson (8)
| American Airlines Center19,532
| 27–30
|-style="background:#cfc;"
| 58
| February 12
| @ Dallas
| 
| Reggie Jackson (24)
| Ivica Zubac (10)
| Reggie Jackson (8)
| American Airlines Center20,028
| 28-30
|-style="background:#cfc;"
| 59
| February 14
| Golden State
| 
| Terance Mann (25)
| Zubac, Jackson, Batum (8)
| Reggie Jackson (9)
| Crypto.com Arena19,068
| 29-30
|-style="background:#fcc;"
| 60
| February 15
| @ Phoenix
| 
| Marcus Morris (23)
| Ivica Zubac (13)
| Reggie Jackson (8)
| Footprint Center17,071
| 29–31
|-style="background:#cfc;"
| 61
| February 17
| Houston
| 
| Marcus Morris (27)
| Ivica Zubac (10)
| Reggie Jackson (14)
| Crypto.com Arena17,519
| 30–31
|- align="center"
|colspan="9" bgcolor="#bbcaff"|All-Star Break
|-style="background:#cfc;"
| 62
| February 25
| @ L.A. Lakers
| 
| Terance Mann (19)
| Terance Mann (10)
| Jackson, Hartenstein (6)
| Crypto.com Arena19,068
| 31-31
|-style="background:#cfc;"
| 63
| February 27
| @ Houston
| 
| Reggie Jackson (26)
| Ivica Zubac (15)
| Reggie Jackson (6)
| Toyota Center14,324
| 32–31

|-style="background:#cfc;"
| 64
| March 1
| @ Houston
| 
| Ivica Zubac (22)
| Ivica Zubac (12)
| Reggie Jackson (6)
| Toyota Center12,949
| 33-31
|-style="background:#cfc;"
| 65
| March 3
| L.A. Lakers
| 
| Reggie Jackson (36)
| Ivica Zubac (9)
| Reggie Jackson (9)
| Crypto.com Arena19,068
| 34–31
|-style="background:#fcc;"
| 66
| March 6
| New York
| 
| Amir Coffey (16)
| Ivica Zubac (9) 
| Hartenstein, Jackson, Mann (4)
| Crypto.com Arena17,422
| 34–32
|-style="background:#fcc;"
| 67
| March 8
| @ Golden State
| 
| Nicolas Batum (17)
| Ivica Zubac (9) 
| Reggie Jackson (7)
| Chase Center18,064
| 34–33
|-style="background:#cfc;"
| 68
| March 9
| Washington
| 
| Reggie Jackson (31)
| Zubac, Mann (9)
| Reggie Jackson (7)
| Crypto.com Arena15,282
| 35–33
|-style="background:#fcc;"
| 69
| March 11
| @ Atlanta
| 
| Jackson, Zubac (24)
| Ivica Zubac (12)
| Reggie Jackson (5)
| State Farm Arena16,862
| 35–34
|-style="background:#cfc;"
| 70
| March 13
| @ Detroit
| 
| Marcus Morris (31)
| Ivica Zubac (15)
| Reggie Jackson (9)
| Little Caesars Arena19,313
| 36–34
|-style="background:#fcc;"
| 71
| March 14
| @ Cleveland
| 
| Ivica Zubac (24)
| Ivica Zubac (14)
| Nicolas Batum (6)
| Rocket Mortgage FieldHouse18,742
| 36–35
|-style="background:#fcc;"
| 72
| March 16
| Toronto
| 
| Reggie Jackson (23)
| Terance Mann (9)
| Reggie Jackson (9)
| Crypto.com Arena19,068
| 36–36
|-style="background:#fcc;"
| 73
| March 18
| @ Utah
| 
| Robert Covington (18)
| Isaiah Hartenstein (9)
| Isaiah Hartenstein (8)
| Vivint Arena18,306
| 36–37
|-style="background:#fcc;"
| 74
| March 22
| @ Denver
| 
| Terance Mann (24)
| Terance Mann (8)
| Reggie Jackson (6)
| Ball Arena16,089
| 36–38
|-style="background:#fcc;"
| 75
| March 25
| Philadelphia
| 
| Amir Coffey (21)
| Isaiah Hartenstein (9)
| Ivica Zubac (6)
| Crypto.com Arena19,068
| 36–39
|-style="background:#cfc;"
| 76
| March 29
| Utah
| 
| Paul George (34)
| Isaiah Hartenstein (7)
| George, Hartenstein (6)
| Crypto.com Arena19,068
| 37–39
|-style="background:#fcc"
| 77
| March 31
| @ Chicago
| 
| Reggie Jackson (34)
| Ivica Zubac (9)
| Reggie Jackson (7)
| United Center21,519
| 37–40

|-style="background:#cfc"
| 78
| April 1
| @ Milwaukee
|  
| Robert Covington (43)
| Isaiah Hartenstein (10)
| Amir Coffey (7)
| Fiserv Forum18,023
| 38–40
|-style="background:#cfc"
| 79
| April 3
| New Orleans
| 
| Marcus Morris (22)
| Ivica Zubac (14)
|  Reggie Jackson (10)
| Crypto.com Arena16,840
| 39–40
|-style="background:#cfc"
| 80
| April 6
| Phoenix
| 
|  Norman Powell (24)
|  Ivica Zubac (11)
|  Isaiah Hartenstein (5)
| Crypto.com Arena19,068
| 40-40
|-style="background:#cfc"
| 81
| April 9
| Sacramento
| 
| Paul George (23)
| Ivica Zubac (12)
| Paul George (12)
| Crypto.com Arena17,568
| 41-40
|-style="background:#cfc"
| 82
| April 10
| Oklahoma City
| 
| Amir Coffey (35)
| Amir Coffey (13)
| Xavier Moon (7)
| Crypto.com Arena18,210
| 42-40

Play-in

|- style="background:#fcc;"
| 1
| April 12
| @ Minnesota
| 
| Paul George (34)
| Ivica Zubac (9)
| Jackson, George (5)
| Target Center17,136
| 0–1
|- style="background:#fcc;"
| 2
| April 15
| New Orleans
| 
| Morris, Jackson (27)
| Nicolas Batum (10)
| Jackson (8)
| Crypto.com Arena19,068
| 0–2

Transactions

Trades

Free agency

Re-signed

Additions

Subtractions

References

Notes

Los Angeles Clippers seasons
Los Angeles Clippers
Los Angeles Clippers
Los Angeles Clippers
Clippers
Clippers